Ancylis ancorata is a moth of the family Tortricidae first described by Edward Meyrick in 1912. It is found on the Konkan Coast of western India. and Sri Lanka.

Description
Adult male wingspan is 12–13 mm. It is metallic in nature.

References

Moths of Asia
Moths described in 1912
Enarmoniini
Taxa named by Edward Meyrick